The District of Pilten was an autonomous district of the Polish–Lithuanian Commonwealth and also in union with the Duchy of Courland and Semigallia.

History 
The district was created after the death of Magnus, Duke of Holstein, it was incorporated into the Commonwealth on the basis of the Polish-Danish treaty from April 10, 1585, in Kronborg. The District was occupied by the Swedish troops from  1600 to 1611. After the Third Partition of Poland, the district became part of the Courland Governorate.

References 

 
 

Subdivisions of the Polish–Lithuanian Commonwealth